The Silver Lake Wilderness Area, an Adirondack Park unit of the Forest Preserve, is located in the towns of Lake Pleasant, Benson, Wells and Arietta in Hamilton County and is roughly bounded on the north by NY 8 and private lands near Piseco Lake, Oxbow Lake, Hamilton Lake, Sand Lake and Lake Pleasant; on the east by NY 30; on the south generally by the Hamilton County line; and on the west by NY 10, the West Branch of the Sacandaga River and the Piseco Outlet.

The area contains 48 bodies of water covering 569 acres (2.3 km2), 26.5 miles (42.6 km) of foot trails, and 2 lean-tos.

Geography
The terrain is relatively low with rolling hills and only four mountain tops that exceed  elevation. There is a considerable area of conifer swamp as well as some beaver meadows along the streams.

Forest
The forest cover is chiefly mixed hardwoods and softwoods with some stands of nearly pure hemlock in large diameter size. In the swamp area along streams and at the higher elevations around the mountain tops, the forest cover runs predominantly to spruce and balsam.

Water
Silver Lake is the principal attraction near the center of this area, chiefly for brook trout fishermen. Mud lake, Rock Lake and Loomis Pond are also popular trout fishing spots. Big Eddy on the West Branch of the Sacandaga River and Cathead Mountain also attract visitors to the area.

Recreation
The area is suitable for hiking and backpacking.  The Northville-Placid Trail has its southern terminus in Benson at the southern edge of the area and runs through the center in a northerly direction, crossing the northern boundary near Piseco Lake. Although this trail has some use by hikers, the foot trail from the vicinity of Hamilton Lake to the top of Hamilton Mountain is a more popular trail.

See also
 List of Wilderness Areas in the Adirondack Park

References
 Adirondack Park Agency. "Adirondack State Land Master Plan", Updated 2001. 
 Department of Environmental Conservation. Silver Lake Wilderness Area Unit Management Plan. E. Kasza, April 2006.

Wilderness areas in Adirondack Park
Protected areas of Hamilton County, New York